Miloš Krasić (born 1 November 1984) is a Serbian former professional footballer who played as a winger. He represented the Serbia national team at the 2010 FIFA World Cup, and at one point in his career, he was named by FourFourTwo as one of the 100 best players in the world.

Early years
Krasić was born on 1 November 1984 in Titova Mitrovica, SR Serbia, SFR Yugoslavia, to Serbian parents Veljko and Zorica. He is the younger brother of Bojan Krasić. After starting out with the hometown side FK Rudar, Krasić was noticed by FK Vojvodina in 1998 and he made a switch northwards at age 13. He spent the next four-and-a-half seasons in Novi Sad, where he further raised his level and became the team captain.

Club career

CSKA Moscow
Vojvodina and CSKA Moscow were in negotiations over Krasić's transfer since January 2004, but the deal stalled. The player himself even made several unsuccessful trips to Moscow. During the summer of 2004, the deal was completed and the winger was on his way to Russia. He featured in three games during the club's 2004–05 UEFA Cup-winning run, including an appearance in the final as a substitute. He also helped them win the Russian Premier League in 2005 and 2006, the Russian Cup in 2005, 2006, 2008 and 2009, and the Russian Super Cup in 2006, 2007 and 2009.

Juventus
After much speculation in the summer of 2010, Juventus and CSKA agreed on a fee for Krasić reported to be in the range of about €15 million. Krasić officially became a Juventus player on 21 August and was given the number 27 shirt. Krasić was instrumental in his home debut against Sampdoria, assisting a goal and creating many chances. The game ended 3–3. In his second away game in the Serie A, against Udinese, Krasić proved once again instrumental in their 4–0 victory, assisting Fabio Quagliarella and Claudio Marchisio for a goal each. Krasić scored his first Juventus goals against Cagliari on 26 September 2010, netting a hat-trick.

He scored his first European goal for Juventus, helping his side salvage a point against Austrian side Red Bull Salzburg in the Group A tie of the 2010–11 UEFA Europa League, in a match that finished 1–1. On 26 October, he was given a two-match ban after diving, although winning a penalty (the penalty was then missed), during the league match against Bologna. Krasić scored a goal in a 2–0 away win over Genoa after Eduardo put a ball in his own net in the 18th minute. On 12 December, in the game against Lazio, Krasić scored a very late, match-winning goal in which his attempted cross deflected off Lazio goalkeeper Fernando Muslera and into the net. The match ended immediately after the goal in a 2–1 victory for Juventus. He scored a screamer which guided the Bianconeri to a 2–1 victory against Brescia. He managed to score another screamer against Roma in which the match ended 2–0.

In the 2011–12 season, under manager Antonio Conte, Krasić lost his place in the starting line-up and managed to make only 9 appearances, scoring once (against Catania on 25 September 2011). However, as the team finished first in the Serie A, he became an Italian highest league winner.

Fenerbahçe

Fenerbahçe completed the transfer of Krasić for €7 million on 3 August 2012. He signed a four-year contract worth €2.3 million per-season. His played first match for the club on 12 August 2012 against rivals Galatasaray, then scored his first goal for Fenerbahçe against Göztepe in a 4–0 Turkish Cup victory.

Loan to Bastia
On the last day of the 2013 summer transfer window, French side Bastia managed to acquire Krasić on a season-long loan deal for €826,000. He scored a skillful goal in a 2–0 win against Evian on 1 December 2013.

Back to Fenerbahçe
Prior to the 2014–15 season, Krasić returned to Fenerbahçe after his loan season but could not break into first team squad, instead beginning to play for the club's reserve team. Before the 2015–2016 season, he was called up to train with the first team.

Lechia Gdańsk
On 30 August 2015, Krasić signed for Polish club Lechia Gdańsk. He made his debut during the second half of Lechia's Ekstraklasa match with Korona Kielce. He spent three seasons at the club.

International career
Krasić was an important member of the Serbia and Montenegro under-21 squad in two UEFA European Under-21 Championships, as well as at the 2004 Summer Olympics. He was in the team that finished as runners-up in the 2004 European U-21 Championship in Germany, but did not play in any games. Two months later, he was part of the Serbia and Montenegro squad at the 2004 Summer Olympics.

In May 2006, Krasić played a leading role in the 2006 European U-21 Championship. He made his debut for the senior side later that year in a friendly against Denmark.

At senior level, Krasić was an important player for Serbia in 2010 FIFA World Cup qualification. He scored one goal in the match against Lithuania, another in the game against Austria and set up three in the game against Romania, which sealed his nation's qualification to the final tournament in South Africa.

In June 2010, he was selected in Serbia's squad for the 2010 FIFA World Cup, where he played on all three group stage matches.

Style of play
Krasić is a right-sided winger, noted for his powerful dribbling technique, energy on the pitch, and sprinting speed. During his time with Juventus, he earned comparisons with former Juventus great Pavel Nedvěd, due to their similar physical appearance, playing role, hard-working playing style, and Eastern European origins. He was named one of three examples of "traditional wingers" (the other two were Antonio Valencia and Ángel Di María) by UEFA's Champions magazine, who says such wingers take on the full-backs by the flanks to get as close to the goal-line as possible to cross the ball.

Career statistics

Club

International

Scores and results list Serbia's goal tally first, score column indicates score after each Krasić goal.

Honours
CSKA
 Russian Premier League: 2005, 2006
 Russian Cup: 2004–05, 2005–06, 2007–08, 2008–09
 Russian Super Cup: 2006, 2007, 2009
 UEFA Cup: 2004–05

Juventus
 Serie A: 2011–12

Fenerbahçe
 Turkish Cup: 2012–13

Individual
 Serbian Player of the Year: 2009
 In the list of 33 best football players of the championship of Russia (4): 2006, 2007, 2008, 2009

References

External links

 Miloš Krasić at reprezentacija.rs 
 Profile @ TFF.org
 

1984 births
Living people
Sportspeople from Mitrovica, Kosovo
Kosovo Serbs
Serbian footballers
Association football midfielders
Serbia international footballers
Serbia under-21 international footballers
Footballers at the 2004 Summer Olympics
Olympic footballers of Serbia and Montenegro
2010 FIFA World Cup players
FK Vojvodina players
PFC CSKA Moscow players
UEFA Cup winning players
Juventus F.C. players
Fenerbahçe S.K. footballers
SC Bastia players
Russian Premier League players
Serie A players
Süper Lig players
Ligue 1 players
Lechia Gdańsk players
Ekstraklasa players
Serbian expatriate footballers
Serbian expatriate sportspeople in Russia
Expatriate footballers in Russia
Serbian expatriate sportspeople in Italy
Expatriate footballers in Italy
Serbian expatriate sportspeople in Turkey
Expatriate footballers in Turkey
Serbian expatriate sportspeople in France
Expatriate footballers in France
Serbian expatriate sportspeople in Poland
Expatriate footballers in Poland